The 2014–15 Saint Peter's Peacocks men's basketball team represented Saint Peter's University during the 2014–15 NCAA Division I men's basketball season. The Peacocks, led by ninth year head coach John Dunne, played their home games at the Yanitelli Center and were members of the Metro Atlantic Athletic Conference. They finished the season 16–18, 8–12 in MAAC play to finish in seventh place. They advanced to the semifinals of the MAAC tournament where they lost to Manhattan.

Roster

Schedule

|-
!colspan=9 style="background:#0000FF; color:#FFFFFF;"| Regular season

|-
!colspan=9 style="background:#0000FF; color:#FFFFFF;"| MAAC tournament

References

Saint Peter's Peacocks men's basketball seasons
Saint Peter's
Saint Peter's Peacocks basketball
Saint Peter's Peacocks basketball